PC Player was a short lived PC videogaming magazine published in the UK by Maverick Magazines. Launched in December 1993 with John Davison as editor, PC Player devoted the majority of its pages covering simulation, adventure and strategy games and often featured games over six page spreads. Reviews featured a five star rating system and an independent expert from other magazines gave additional comments on the bigger reviews. Other more action orientated games were given smaller coverage in a dedicated round up section. Content wise, the magazine featured news, articles, reviews, previews, tips and columns on all things gaming. Hugh Gollner, publisher and owner of Maverick Magazines, granted Out-of-Print Archive permission to release digital versions of the magazine.

References

External links
The Official PC Player archive
Interview with Hugh Gollner

Defunct computer magazines published in the United Kingdom
Home computer magazines
Magazines established in 1993
Magazines disestablished in 1994
Mass media in Oxford
Monthly magazines published in the United Kingdom
Video game magazines published in the United Kingdom